Tor is a genus of cyprinid fish commonly known as mahseers.

Species
The currently recognized species in this genus are:
 Tor ater T. R. Roberts, 1999
 Tor dongnaiensis H. Đ. Hoàng, H. M. Phạm, J.-D. Durand, N. T. Trần & P. D. Phan, 2015 (Dongnai mahseer) 
 Tor douronensis (Valenciennes, 1842) (semah)
 Tor hemispinus Y. R. Chen & X. L. Chu, 1985
 Tor khudree (Sykes, 1839) (black mahseer)
 Tor kulkarnii Menon, 1992 (dwarf mahseer)
 Tor laterivittatus W. Zhou & G. H. Cui, 1996
Tor malabaricus Jerdon, 1849 (Malabar mahseer)
 Tor mosal (F. Hamilton, 1822) 
 Tor mekongensis H. Đ. Hoàng, H. M. Phạm, J.-D. Durand, N. T. Trần & P. D. Phan, 2015 (Mekong mahseer) 
 Tor polylepis W. Zhou & G. H. Cui, 1996
 Tor putitora (F. Hamilton, 1822) (Himalayan mahseer)
Tor cf. putitora largest known species of cavefish (now Neolissochilus pnar)
 Tor remadevii Kurup & Radhakrishnan, 2007  (orange-finned mahseer)
 Tor sinensis H. W. Wu, 1977 (Chinese mahseer)
 Tor tambra (Valenciennes, 1842)
 Tor tambroides (Bleeker, 1854) (Malayan mahseer, empurau)
 Tor tor (F. Hamilton, 1822) (red-finned mahseer)
 Tor yingjiangensis Z. M. Chen & J. X. Yang, 2004

References

Cyprinidae genera
Cyprinid fish of Asia
Taxa named by John Edward Gray